Omega Point Is the twelfth studio album by Spear of Destiny. The album was made available on Kirk Brandon's official site before the actual release date as a direct download. Unlike the last album, this one was made available on iTunes.

Track listing
All tracks composed by Kirk Brandon
"Bold Grenadier" - 1:45
"Undertow" - 4:29
"Suicide God" - 5:44
"Bloody Bill Anderson" - 3:51
"They Do As Locusts Do" - 3:41
"Model Number One" - 4:04
"Kalashnikov" - 3:34
"Hubris" - 3:19
"People Who Live On the Moon" - 2:51
"Windscale" - 4:23
"Guinness, Ghosts and Rum" - 4:09

Personnel
Spear of Destiny
Kirk Brandon - vocals, guitar
Craig Adams - bass
Adrian Portas - guitar
Mike Kelly - drums
Steve Allan Jones - keyboards
with:
Clint Boon - Farfisa keyboard on "Bloody Bill Anderson"

2010 albums
Spear of Destiny (band) albums